Dum pukht, larhmeen, or slow oven cooking is a cooking technique associated with the Mughal Empire in which meat and vegetables are cooked over a low flame, generally in dough-sealed containers with few spices. Traditions assign its origin in pre-partition India to the reign of Nawab of Awadh Asaf-ud-Daulah (1748–97). The technique is now commonly used in other cuisines such as South Asian, Central Asian, and West Asian.

Method
The term etymologically derives from Persian. Dum means 'to keep food on slow fire' and pukht means 'process of cooking', thus meaning 'cooking on slow fire'. Dum pukht cooking uses a round, heavy-bottomed pot, preferably a handi (clay pot), in which food is sealed and cooked over a slow fire. The two main aspects to this style of cooking are bhunao and dum, or 'roasting' and 'maturing' of a prepared dish. In this cuisine, herbs and spices are important. The process of slow roasting gently allows each to release their maximum flavour. The sealing of the lid of the handi with dough achieves maturing. Cooking slowly in its juices, the food retains its natural aromas.

In some cases, cooking dough is spread over the container, like a lid, to seal the foods; this is known as pardah (veil). Upon cooking, it becomes a bread which has absorbed the flavors of the food. The bread is usually eaten with the dish. 

Fewer spices are used than in traditional Pakistani cooking with fresh spices and herbs for flavouring.

Legendary origin
Legend has it that when Nawab Asaf-ud-daulah (1748–1797) found his kingdom in the grip of famine, he initiated a food-for-work program, employing thousands in the construction of the Bada Imambara shrine. Large cauldrons were filled with rice, meat, vegetables, and spices and sealed to make a simple one-dish meal that was available to workers day and night. One day the Nawab caught a whiff of the aromas emanating from the cauldron and the royal kitchen was ordered to serve the dish.

Other sources, however, simply state that dum pukht appears to be based on a traditional Peshawar method of cooking dishes buried in sand.

See also

 List of cooking techniques

References

Pakistani cuisine
Indian cuisine
Cooking techniques
Telangana cuisine
Hyderabadi cuisine
Punjabi cuisine
Pashtun cuisine
Mughlai cuisine
Muhajir cuisine
Balochi cuisine